The Battle of the Somme (French: Bataille de la Somme; German: Schlacht an der Somme), also known as the Somme offensive, was a battle of the First World War fought by the armies of the British Empire and the French Third Republic against the German Empire. It took place between 1 July and 18 November 1916 on both sides of the upper reaches of the river Somme in France. The battle was intended to hasten a victory for the Allies. More than three million men fought in the battle, of whom one million were either wounded or killed, making it one of the deadliest battles in all of human history.

The French and British had committed themselves to an offensive on the Somme during the Chantilly Conference in December 1915. The Allies agreed upon a strategy of combined offensives against the Central Powers in 1916 by the French, Russian, British and Italian armies, with the Somme offensive as the Franco-British contribution. Initial plans called for the French army to undertake the main part of the Somme offensive, supported on the northern flank by the Fourth Army of the British Expeditionary Force (BEF). When the Imperial German Army began the Battle of Verdun on the Meuse on 21 February 1916, French commanders diverted many of the divisions intended for the Somme and the "supporting" attack by the British became the principal effort. The British troops on the Somme comprised a mixture of the remains of the pre-war army, the Territorial Force and Kitchener's Army, a force of wartime volunteers.

On the first day on the Somme (1 July) the German 2nd Army suffered a serious defeat opposite the French Sixth Army, from Foucaucourt-en-Santerre south of the Somme to Maricourt on the north bank and by the Fourth Army from Maricourt to the vicinity of the Albert–Bapaume road. The 57,470 casualties suffered by the British, including 19,240 killed, were the worst in the history of the British Army. Most of the British casualties were suffered on the front between the Albert–Bapaume road and Gommecourt to the north, which was the area where the principal German defensive effort was made. The battle became notable for the importance of air power and the first use of the tank in September but these were a product of new technology and proved unreliable.

At the end of the battle, British and French forces had penetrated  into German-occupied territory along the majority of the front, their largest territorial gain since the First Battle of the Marne in 1914. The operational objectives of the Anglo-French armies were unfulfilled, as they failed to capture Péronne and Bapaume, where the German armies maintained their positions over the winter. Debate continues over the necessity, significance and effect of the battle.

Strategic developments 

Simultaneous offensives on the Eastern Front by the Russian army, on the Italian Front by the Italian army and on the Western Front by the Franco-British armies were to be carried out to deny time for the Central Powers to move troops between fronts during lulls. In December 1915, General Sir Douglas Haig replaced Field Marshal Sir John French as Commander-in-Chief of the BEF. Haig favoured a British offensive in Flanders, close to BEF supply routes, to drive the Germans from the Belgian coast and end the U-boat threat from Belgian waters. Haig was not formally subordinate to Marshal Joseph Joffre but the British played a lesser role on the Western Front and complied with French strategy.

In January 1916, Joffre had agreed to the BEF making its main effort in Flanders but in February 1916 it was decided to mount a combined offensive where the French and British armies met, astride the Somme River in Picardy before the British offensive in Flanders. A week later the Germans began the Battle of Verdun against the French army. By 31 May, the ambitious Franco-British plan for a decisive victory had been reduced to a limited offensive to relieve pressure on the French at Verdun and inflict attrition on the German armies in the west.

The Chief of the German General Staff, Erich von Falkenhayn, intended to end the war by splitting the Anglo-French Entente in 1916, before its material superiority became unbeatable. Falkenhayn planned to defeat the large number of reserves which the Entente could move into the path of a breakthrough, by threatening a sensitive point close to the existing front line and provoking the French into counter-attacking German positions. Falkenhayn chose to attack towards Verdun to take the Meuse heights and make Verdun untenable. The French would have to conduct a counter-offensive on ground dominated by the German army and ringed with masses of heavy artillery, leading to huge losses and bringing the French army close to collapse. The British would mount a hasty relief offensive and suffer similar losses. Falkenhayn expected the relief offensive to fall south of Arras against the 6th Army and be destroyed. (Despite the certainty by mid-June of an Anglo-French attack on the Somme against the 2nd Army, Falkenhayn sent only four divisions, keeping eight in the western strategic reserve. No divisions were taken from the Sixth Army, despite it holding a shorter line with  divisions and three of the divisions in OHL reserve behind the 6th Army. The maintenance of the strength of the 6th Army, at the expense of the 2nd Army on the Somme, indicated that Falkenhayn intended the counter-offensive against the British to be made north of the Somme front, once the British offensive had been shattered.) If such Franco-British defeats were not enough, Germany would attack the remnants of both armies and end the western alliance for good.

Battle of Verdun 

The Battle of Verdun ( December 1916) began a week after Joffre and Haig agreed to mount an offensive on the Somme. The German offensive at Verdun was intended to threaten the capture of the city and induce the French to fight an attrition battle, in which German advantages of terrain and firepower would cause the French disproportionate casualties. The battle changed the nature of the offensive on the Somme, as French divisions were diverted to Verdun, and the main effort by the French diminished to a supporting attack for the British. German overestimation of the cost of Verdun to the French contributed to the concentration of German infantry and guns on the north bank of the Somme. By May, Joffre and Haig had changed their expectations of an offensive on the Somme, from a decisive battle to a hope that it would relieve Verdun and keep German divisions in France, which would assist the Russian armies conducting the Brusilov Offensive. The German offensive at Verdun was suspended in July, and troops, guns, and ammunition were transferred to Picardy, leading to a similar transfer of the French Tenth Army to the Somme front. Later in the year, the Franco-British were able to attack on the Somme and at Verdun sequentially and the French recovered much of the ground lost on the east bank of the Meuse in October and December.

Brusilov offensive 

The Brusilov offensive on the Eastern Front absorbed the extra forces that had been requested on 2 June by Fritz von Below, commanding the German Second Army, for a spoiling attack on the Somme. During the offensive the Russians inflicted  including . Three divisions were ordered from France to the Eastern Front on 9 June and the spoiling attack on the Somme was abandoned. Only four more divisions were sent to the Somme front before the Anglo-French offensive began, bringing the total to  divisions. Falkenhayn, and then Hindenburg and Ludendorff, were forced to send divisions to Russia throughout the summer to prevent a collapse of the Austro-Hungarian army and then to conduct a counter-offensive against Romania, which declared war against the Central Powers on 27 August.

Tactical developments 

The original British Expeditionary Force (BEF) of 6 divisions and the Cavalry Division, had lost most of the British pre-war regulars in the battles of 1914 and 1915. The bulk of the army was made up of volunteers of the Territorial Force and Kitchener's Army, which had begun forming in August 1914. Rapid expansion created many vacancies for senior commands and specialist functions, which led to many appointments of retired officers and inexperienced newcomers. In 1914, Douglas Haig had been a lieutenant-general in command of I Corps and was promoted to command the First Army in early 1915 and then the BEF in December, which eventually comprised five armies with sixty divisions. The swift increase in the size of the army reduced the average level of experience within it and created an acute equipment shortage. Many officers resorted to directive command to avoid delegating to novice subordinates, although divisional commanders were given great latitude in training and planning for the attack of 1 July, since the heterogeneous nature of the 1916 army made it impossible for corps and army commanders to know the capacity of each division.

Despite considerable debate among German staff officers, Erich von Falkenhayn continued the policy of unyielding defence in 1916. Falkenhayn implied after the war that the psychology of German soldiers, shortage of manpower and lack of reserves made the policy inescapable, as the troops necessary to seal off breakthroughs did not exist. High losses incurred in holding ground by a policy of no retreat were preferable to higher losses, voluntary withdrawals and the effect of a belief that soldiers had discretion to avoid battle. When a more flexible policy was substituted later, decisions about withdrawal were still reserved to army commanders. On the Somme front, Falkenhayn's construction plan of January 1915 had been completed. The trenches were traversed and had sentry-posts in concrete recesses built into the parapet. An intermediate line of strongpoints (the ) about  behind the front line was also built. Communication trenches ran back to the reserve line, renamed the second position, which was as well-built and wired as the first position. The second position was beyond the range of Allied field artillery, to force an attacker to stop and move field artillery forward before assaulting the position.

Prelude

Anglo-French plan of attack 

French losses at Verdun reduced the contribution available for the offensive on the Somme and increased the urgency for the commencement of operations on the Somme. The principal role in the offensive devolved to the British and on 16 June, Haig defined the objectives of the offensive as the relief of pressure on the French at Verdun and the infliction of losses on the Germans.  After a five-day artillery bombardment, the British Fourth Army was to capture  of the German first line, from Montauban to Serre and the Third Army was to mount a diversion at Gommecourt. In a second phase, the Fourth Army was to take the German second position, from Pozières to the Ancre and then the second position south of the Albert–Bapaume Road, ready for an attack on the German third position south of the road towards Flers, when the Reserve Army which included three cavalry divisions, would exploit the success to advance east and then north towards Arras. The French Sixth Army, with one corps on the north bank from Maricourt to the Somme and two corps on the south bank southwards to Foucaucourt, would make a subsidiary attack to guard the right flank of the main attack being made by the British.

Betrayal of British plans 
Research in German archives revealed in 2016 that the date and location of the British offensive had been betrayed to German interrogators by two politically disgruntled soldiers several weeks in advance. The German military accordingly undertook significant defensive preparatory work on the British section of the Somme offensive.

German defences on the Somme 

The Somme defences had two inherent weaknesses that the rebuilding had not remedied. The front trenches were on a forward slope, lined by white chalk from the subsoil and easily seen by ground observers. The concentration of troops at the front line on a forward slope guaranteed that it would face the bulk of an artillery bombardment, directed by ground observers on clearly marked lines.

Battles of the Somme, 1916

First phase: 1–17 July 1916

Battle of Albert, 1–13 July 

The Battle of Albert was the first two weeks of Anglo-French offensive operations in the Battle of the Somme. The Allied preparatory artillery bombardment began on 24 June and the Anglo-French infantry attacked on 1 July, on the south bank from Foucaucourt to the Somme and from the Somme north to Gommecourt,  beyond Serre. The French Sixth Army and the right wing of the British Fourth Army inflicted a considerable defeat on the German Second Army, but from the Albert–Bapaume road to Gommecourt the British attack was a disaster where most of the  casualties were incurred. Against Joffre's wishes, Haig abandoned the offensive north of the road, to reinforce the success in the south, where the Anglo-French forces pressed forward towards the German second line, preparatory to a general attack on 14 July. Following such was a reviewal noting that the British companies present moved at full-kit due to the overconfidence of general field NCO's to the German Location after witnessing such a bombardment upon their location.

First day  

The Battle of the Somme lasted  beginning with the opening day of the Battle of Albert. The attack was made by five divisions of the French Sixth Army on the east side of the Somme, eleven British divisions of the Fourth Army north of the Somme to Serre and two divisions of the Third Army opposite Gommecourt, against the German Second Army of General Fritz von Below. The German defence south of the Albert–Bapaume road mostly collapsed and the French had "complete success" on both banks of the Somme, as did the British from the army boundary at Maricourt to the Albert–Bapaume road. On the south bank the German defence was made incapable of resisting another attack and a substantial retreat began; on the north bank the abandonment of Fricourt was ordered. The defenders on the commanding ground north of the road inflicted a huge defeat on the British infantry, who took an unprecedented number of casualties. Several truces were negotiated to recover wounded from no man's land north of the road. The French Sixth Army had , and the German 2nd Army had .

Battle of Bazentin Ridge, 14–17 July 

The Fourth Army attacked the German second defensive position from the Somme past Guillemont and Ginchy, north-west along the crest of the ridge to Pozières on the Albert–Bapaume road. The objectives of the attack were the villages of Bazentin le Petit, Bazentin le Grand and Longueval which was adjacent to Delville Wood, with High Wood on the ridge beyond. Field artillery fired a creeping barrage and the attacking waves pushed up close behind it in no man's land, leaving them only a short distance to cross when the barrage lifted from the German front trench. Most of the objective was captured and the German defence south of the Albert–Bapaume road put under great strain but the attack was not followed up due to British communication failures, casualties and disorganisation.

Battle of Fromelles, 19–20 July 

The Battle of Fromelles was a subsidiary attack to support the Fourth Army on the Somme  to the south, to exploit any weakening of the German defences opposite. Preparations for the attack were rushed, the troops involved lacked experience in trench warfare and the power of the German defence was "gravely" underestimated, the attackers being . On 19 July, von Falkenhayn had judged the British attack to be the anticipated offensive against the 6th Army. Next day, Falkenhayn ordered the Guard Reserve Corps to be withdrawn to reinforce the Somme front. The Battle of Fromelles had inflicted some losses on the German defenders but gained no ground and deflected few German troops bound for the Somme. The attack was the debut of the Australian Imperial Force on the Western Front and, according to McMullin, "the worst 24 hours in Australia's entire history". Of ,  were incurred by the 5th Australian Division; German losses were   prisoner.

Second phase: July–September 1916

Battle of Delville Wood, 14 July – 15 September 

The Battle of Delville Wood was an operation to secure the British right flank, while the centre advanced to capture the higher-lying areas of High Wood and Pozières. After the Battle of Albert the offensive had evolved to the capture of fortified villages, woods, and other terrain that offered observation for artillery fire, jumping-off points for more attacks, and other tactical advantages. The mutually costly fighting at Delville Wood eventually secured the British right flank and marked the Western Front debut of the South African 1st Infantry Brigade (incorporating a Southern Rhodesian contingent), which held the wood from 15 to 20 July. When relieved, the brigade had lost , similar to the casualties of many brigades on 1 July.

Battle of Pozières, 23 July – 7 August 

The Battle of Pozières began with the capture of the village by the 1st Australian Division (Australian Imperial Force) of the Reserve Army, the only British success in the Allied fiasco of  when a general attack combined with the French further south, degenerated into a series of separate attacks due to communication failures, supply failures and poor weather. German bombardments and counter-attacks began on 23 July and continued until 7 August. The fighting ended with the Reserve Army taking the plateau north and east of the village, overlooking the fortified village of Thiepval from the rear.

Battle of Guillemont, 3–6 September 

The Battle of Guillemont was an attack on the village which was captured by the Fourth Army on the first day. Guillemont was on the right flank of the British sector, near the boundary with the French Sixth Army. German defences ringed the British salient at Delville Wood to the north and had observation over the French Sixth Army area to the south towards the Somme river. The German defence in the area was based on the second line and numerous fortified villages and farms north from Maurepas at Combles, Guillemont, Falfemont Farm, Delville Wood and High Wood, which were mutually supporting. The battle for Guillemont was considered by some observers to be the supreme effort of the German army during the battle. Numerous meetings were held by Joffre, Haig, Foch, General Sir Henry Rawlinson (commander of the British Fourth Army) and Fayolle to co-ordinate joint attacks by the four armies, all of which broke down. A pause in Anglo-French attacks at the end of August, coincided with the largest counter-attack by the German army in the Battle of the Somme.

Battle of Ginchy, 9 September 

In the Battle of Ginchy the 16th Division captured the German-held village. After the end of the Battle of Guillemont, British troops were required to advance to positions which would give observation over the German third position, ready for a general attack in mid-September. British attacks from Leuze Wood northwards to Ginchy had begun on 3 September, when the 7th Division captured the village and was then forced out by a German counter-attack. The capture of Ginchy and the success of the French Sixth Army on 12 September, in its biggest attack of the battle of the Somme, enabled both armies to make much bigger attacks, sequenced with the Tenth and Reserve armies, which captured much more ground and inflicted  casualties on the German defenders during the month.

Third phase: September–November 1916

Battle of Flers–Courcelette, 15–22 September 

The Battle of Flers–Courcelette was the third and final general offensive mounted by the British Army, which attacked an intermediate line and the German third line to take Morval, Lesboeufs and Gueudecourt, which was combined with a French attack on Frégicourt and Rancourt to encircle Combles and a supporting attack on the south bank of the Somme. The battle was the debut of the Canadian Corps, the New Zealand Division and tanks of the Heavy Branch of the Machine Gun Corps on the Somme.

Battle of Morval, 25–28 September 

The Battle of Morval was an attack by the Fourth Army on Morval, Gueudecourt and Lesboeufs held by the German 1st Army, which had been the final objectives of the Battle of Flers–Courcelette (15–22 September). The attack was postponed to combine with attacks by the French Sixth Army on Combles, south of Morval and because of rain. The combined attack was also intended to deprive the German defenders further west, near Thiepval of reinforcements, before an attack by the Reserve Army, due on 26 September. Combles, Morval, Lesboeufs and Gueudecourt were captured and a small number of tanks joined in the battle later in the afternoon. Many casualties were inflicted on the Germans but the French made slower progress. The Fourth Army advance on 25 September was its deepest since 14 July and left the Germans in severe difficulties, particularly in a salient near Combles. The Reserve Army attack began on 26 September in the Battle of Thiepval Ridge.

Battle of Thiepval Ridge, 26–28 September 

The Battle of Thiepval Ridge was the first large offensive mounted by the Reserve Army of Lieutenant General Hubert Gough and was intended to benefit from the Fourth Army attack at Morval by starting  afterwards. Thiepval Ridge was well fortified and the German defenders fought with great determination, while the British co-ordination of infantry and artillery declined after the first day, due to confused fighting in the maze of trenches, dug-outs and shell-craters. The final British objectives were not reached until the Battle of the Ancre Heights (1 October – 11 November). Organisational difficulties and deteriorating weather frustrated Joffre's intention to proceed by vigorous co-ordinated attacks by the Anglo-French armies, which became disjointed and declined in effectiveness during late September, at the same time as a revival occurred in the German defence. The British experimented with new techniques in gas warfare, machine-gun bombardment and tank–infantry co-operation, as the Germans struggled to withstand the preponderance of men and material fielded by the Anglo-French, despite reorganisation and substantial reinforcements of troops, artillery and aircraft from Verdun. September became the worst month for casualties for the Germans.

Battle of the Transloy Ridges, 1 October – 11 November 

The Battle of Le Transloy began in good weather and Le Sars was captured on 7 October. Haig consulted with the army commanders and on  reduced the scope of operations by cancelling the Third Army plans and reducing the Reserve Army and Fourth Army attacks to limited operations, in co-operation with the French Sixth Army. Another pause followed before operations resumed on 23 October on the northern flank of the Fourth Army, with a delay during more bad weather on the right flank of the Fourth Army and on the French Sixth Army front, until 5 November. Next day, the Fourth Army ceased offensive operations, except for small attacks intended to improve positions and divert German attention from attacks being made by the Reserve/Fifth Army. Larger operations resumed in January 1917.

Battle of the Ancre Heights, 1 October – 11 November 

The Battle of the Ancre Heights was fought after Haig made plans for the Third Army to take the area east of Gommecourt, the Reserve Army to attack north from Thiepval Ridge and east from Beaumont Hamel–Hébuterne and for the Fourth Army to reach the Péronne–Bapaume road around Le Transloy and Beaulencourt–Thilloy–Loupart Wood, north of the Albert–Bapaume road. The Marine Brigade from Flanders and fresh German divisions brought from quiet fronts counter-attacked frequently and the British objectives were not secured until 11 November.

Battle of the Ancre, 13–18 November 

The Battle of the Ancre was the last big British operation of the year. The Fifth (formerly Reserve) Army attacked into the Ancre valley to exploit German exhaustion after the Battle of the Ancre Heights and gain ground ready for a resumption of the offensive in 1917. Political calculation, concern for Allied morale and Joffre's pressure for a continuation of attacks in France, to prevent German troop transfers to Russia and Italy also influenced Haig. The battle began with another mine being detonated beneath Hawthorn Ridge Redoubt. The attack on Serre failed, although a brigade of the 31st Division, which had attacked in the disaster of 1 July, took its objectives before being withdrawn later. South of Serre, Beaumont Hamel and Beaucourt-sur-l'Ancre were captured. South of the Ancre, St. Pierre Division was captured, the outskirts of Grandcourt reached and the Canadian 4th Division captured Regina Trench north of Courcelette, then took Desire Support Trench on 18 November. Until January 1917 a lull set in, as both sides concentrated on enduring the weather.

Subsequent operations

Ancre, January–March 1917 

After the Battle of the Ancre (13–18 November 1916), British attacks on the Somme front were stopped by the weather and military operations by both sides were mostly restricted to survival in the rain, snow, fog, mud fields, waterlogged trenches and shell-holes. As preparations for the offensive at Arras continued, the British attempted to keep German attention on the Somme front. On  the Germans fell back another  on a  front.

Hindenburg Line 

General Erich von Falkenhayn, the German Chief of the General Staff, was sacked and replaced by Hindenburg and Ludendorff at the end of August 1916. At a conference at Cambrai on 5 September, a decision was taken to build a new defensive line well behind the Somme front. The  was to be built from Arras to St. Quentin, La Fère and Condé, with another new line between Verdun and Pont-à-Mousson. Withdrawing to the new line was not an easy decision and the German high command struggled over it during the winter of 1916–1917. Some members wanted to take a shorter step back to a line between Arras and Sailly, while the 1st and 2nd army commanders wanted to stay on the Somme. Generalleutnant von Fuchs on 20 January 1917 said that,

After the loss of a considerable amount of ground around the Ancre valley to the British Fifth Army in February 1917, the German armies on the Somme were ordered on 14 February, to withdraw to reserve lines closer to Bapaume. A further retirement to the Hindenburg Line in Operation Alberich began on 16 March 1917, despite the new line being unfinished and poorly sited in some places.

Defensive positions held by the German army on the Somme after November 1916 were in poor condition; the garrisons were exhausted and censors of correspondence reported tiredness and low morale in front-line soldiers. The situation left the German command doubtful that the army could withstand a resumption of the battle. On 24 February the Germans withdrew, protected by rear guards, over roads in relatively good condition, which were then destroyed. The German withdrawal was helped by a thaw, which turned roads behind the British front into bogs and by disruption, to the railways, which supplied the Somme front.

Analysis 

At the start of 1916, most of the British Army was an inexperienced and patchily trained mass of volunteers. The Somme was a great test for Kitchener's Army, created by Kitchener's call for recruits at the start of the war. The British volunteers were often the fittest, most enthusiastic and best-educated citizens but were inexperienced and it has been claimed that their loss was of lesser military significance than the losses of the remaining peacetime-trained officers and men of the Imperial German Army. British casualties on the first day were the worst in the history of the British Army, with   whom were killed.

British survivors of the battle had gained experience and the BEF learned how to conduct the mass industrial warfare which the continental armies had been fighting since 1914. The European powers had begun the war with trained armies of regulars and reservists, which were wasting assets. Crown Prince Rupprecht of Bavaria wrote, "What remained of the old first-class peace-trained German infantry had been expended on the battlefield". A war of attrition was a logical strategy for Britain against Germany, which was also at war with France and Russia. A school of thought holds that the Battle of the Somme placed unprecedented strain on the German army and that after the battle it was unable to replace casualties like-for-like, which reduced it to a militia. Philpott argues that the German army was exhausted by the end of 1916, with loss of morale and the cumulative effects of attrition and frequent defeats causing it to collapse in 1918, a process which began on the Somme, echoing Churchill's argument that the German soldiery was never the same again.

The destruction of German units in battle was made worse by lack of rest. British and French aircraft and long-range guns reached well behind the front line, where trench-digging and other work meant that troops returned to the line exhausted. Despite the strategic predicament of the German army, it survived the battle, withstood the pressure of the Brusilov Offensive and conquered almost all of Romania. In 1917, the German army in the west survived the large British and French offensives of the Nivelle Offensive and the Third Battle of Ypres, though at great cost.

Until the 1930s the dominant view of the battle in English-language writing was that the battle was a hard-fought victory against a brave, experienced and well-led opponent. Winston Churchill had objected to the way the battle was being fought in August 1916, and Prime Minister David Lloyd George criticised attrition warfare frequently and condemned the battle in his post-war memoirs. In the 1930s a new orthodoxy of "mud, blood and futility" emerged and gained more emphasis in the 1960s when the 50th anniversaries of the Great War battles were commemorated.

Transport

Until 1916, transport arrangements for the BEF were based on an assumption that the war of movement would soon resume and make it pointless to build infrastructure, since it would be left behind. The British relied on motor transport from railheads which was insufficient where large masses of men and guns were concentrated. When the Fourth Army advance resumed in August, the wisdom of not building light railways which would be left behind was argued by some, in favour of building standard gauge lines. Experience of crossing the beaten zone showed that such lines or metalled roads could not be built quickly enough to sustain an advance, and that pausing while communications caught up allowed the defenders to recover. A comprehensive system of transport was needed, which required a much greater diversion of personnel and equipment than had been expected.

Casualties 

The Battle of the Somme was one of the costliest battles of World War I. The original Allied estimate of casualties on the Somme, made at the Chantilly Conference on 15 November 1916, was that the Germans suffered 630,000 casualties, exceeding the 485,000 suffered by the British and French. As one German officer wrote,

However, Churchill wrote that Allied casualties had exceeded German losses. In The World Crisis (first published in the early 1920s, reprinted in 1938), he quoted the German Reichsarchiv data, showing that on the Western Front between February and June 1916, the Germans had suffered  against the French and  July and the end of the year (Appendix J); he wrote that the Germans suffered  at Verdun and that around one eighth of their casualties were suffered on "quiet" sectors. According to the tables, between July and October 1916, German forces on the Western Front suffered   by the French and by the British; German forces inflicted  on the Entente.

In 1931, Hermann Wendt published a comparison of German and British–French casualties which showed an average of 30 per cent more Allied casualties than German losses on the Somme.

McRandle and Quirk in 2006 cast doubt on the Edmonds calculations but counted  casualties on the Western Front from July to December against  Churchill, concluding that there had been fewer German losses than Anglo-French casualties but that the ability of the German army to inflict disproportionate losses had been eroded by attrition. In 2003 British historian Gary Sheffield wrote that the calculation by Edmonds of Anglo-French casualties was correct but the one for German casualties was discredited, quoting the official German figure of 

Prior and Wilson used Churchill's research and wrote that the British suffered  from 1 July to mid-November ( day) in inflicting  casualties and offer no figures for French casualties or the losses they inflicted on the Germans. Sheffield wrote that the losses were "appalling", with  casualties,  and perhaps  casualties.

In a commentary on the debate about Somme casualties, Philpott used Miles's figures of  casualties and the French official figures of  Army losses and  Army casualties. Philpott described German losses as "disputed", with estimates ranging from  The high Allied casualties of July 1916 are not representative of the way attrition turned in the Allies' favour in September, although this was not sustained as the weather deteriorated. Philpott quoted Robin Prior (in Churchill's World Crisis As History [1983]) that the "blood test" is a crude measure compared to manpower reserves, industrial capacity, farm productivity and financial resources and that intangible factors were more influential on the course of the war, which the Allies won despite "losing" the purely quantitative test.

Commemoration 

In the United Kingdom and Newfoundland, the Battle of the Somme became the central memory of World War I. The Royal British Legion with the British Embassy in Paris and the Commonwealth War Graves Commission, commemorate the battle on 1 July each year, at the Thiepval Memorial to the Missing of the Somme. For their efforts on the first day of the battle, The 1st Newfoundland Regiment was given the name "The Royal Newfoundland Regiment" by George V on 28 November 1917. The first day of the Battle of the Somme is commemorated in Newfoundland, remembering the "Best of the Best" at 11am on the Sunday nearest to 1 July. The Somme is remembered in Northern Ireland due to the participation of the 36th (Ulster) Division and commemorated by veterans' groups and by unionist/Protestant groups such as the Orange Order. The British Legion and others commemorate the battle on 1 July.

On 1 July 2016, at 7:28 am British Summer Time, the UK observed a two minute silence to mark the start of the battle which began 100 years earlier. A special ceremony was broadcast on BBC1 and all BBC radio stations participated in the silence. At the start of the silence, the King's Troop, Royal Horse Artillery fired a gun every four seconds for one hundred seconds and a whistle was blown to end it. Just like a Remembrance Sunday silence, a bugler played The Last Post after the silence. The silence was announced during a speech by the prime minister David Cameron who said, "There will be a national two-minute silence on Friday morning. I will be attending a service at the Thiepval Memorial near the battlefield, and it's right that the whole country pauses to remember the sacrifices of all those who fought and lost their lives in that conflict." On 1 July 2016, a ceremony was held in Heaton Park in north Manchester in England. Heaton Park was the site of a large army training camp during the war.

Across Britain on 1 July 2016, 1400 actors dressed in replica World War I-period British Army uniforms walked about in streets and public open areas, from 7am to 7pm. Each took on temporarily the identity of a British soldier who died on the first day of the Somme, and handed out information cards about that soldier. They did not talk, except for occasionally singing "We're here because we're here" to the tune of Auld Lang Syne. This event was called "Ghost Soldiers".

Histories of the battle
The Battle of the Somme has been called the beginning of modern all-arms warfare, during which Kitchener's Army learned to fight the mass-industrial war in which the continental armies had been engaged for two years. This view sees the British contribution to the battle as part of a coalition war and part of a process, which took the strategic initiative from the German Army and caused it irreparable damage, leading to its collapse in late 1918.

Haig and General Rawlinson have been criticised ever since 1916 for the human cost of the battle and for failing to achieve their territorial objectives. On 1 August 1916, Winston Churchill, then out of office, criticised the British Army's conduct of the offensive to the British Cabinet, claiming that though the battle had forced the Germans to end their offensive at Verdun, attrition was damaging the British armies more than the German armies. Though Churchill was unable to suggest an alternative, a critical view of the British on the Somme has been influential in English-language writing ever since. In 2016, historian Peter Barton argued in a series of three television programmes that the Battle of the Somme should be regarded as a German defensive victory.

John Terraine, Gary Sheffield, Christopher Duffy, Roger Chickering, Holger Herwig, William Philpott et al. wrote that there was no strategic alternative for the British in 1916 and that an understandable horror at British losses is insular, given the millions of casualties borne by the French and Russian armies since 1914. This school of thought sets the battle in a context of a general Allied offensive in 1916 and notes that German and French writing on the battle puts it in a continental perspective. Little German and French writing on this topic has been translated, leaving much of their historical perspective and detail of German and French military operations inaccessible to the English-speaking world.

See also 

 List of Canadian battles during the First World War
 List of World War I memorials and cemeteries in the Somme
 Order of battle for the Battle of the Somme

Notes

Footnotes

References

Books
 
 
 
 
 
 
 
 
 
 
 
 
 
 
 
 
 
 
 
 
 
 
 }

Journals

Websites

Further reading

External links 

 Battle of the Somme Personnel Records
 Records and images from the UK Parliament Collections
 Battle of the Somme, maps and photo essay
 The British Army in the Great War: The Battles of the Somme, 1916
 New Zealand and the Battle of the Somme
 Peronne Great War Historial
 The Somme – Northern Ireland Remembers
 Official website of Delville Wood
 Experience of the German First Army in the Somme Battle, 24 June – 26 November 1916, Below F., pp. 77–143 (1917)
 CWGC: 1916: The Somme
 Nicholas Hiley: The Battle of the Somme (film), in: 1914-1918-online. International Encyclopedia of the First World War
 William Philpott: Somme, Battles of, in: 1914-1918-online. International Encyclopedia of the First World War
Battle of the Somme (WW1 Documentary) | History Documentary | Reel Truth History

 
Battles of the Western Front (World War I)
Battles in Hauts-de-France
1916 in France
Conflicts in 1916
Tunnel warfare in World War I
Battles of World War I involving Australia
Battles of World War I involving Canada
Battles of World War I involving Germany
Battles of World War I involving France
Battles of World War I involving New Zealand
Battles of World War I involving South Africa
Battles of World War I involving the United Kingdom
Battles involving the French Foreign Legion
November 1916 events